Ujeścisko-Łostowice is one of the administrative districts (dzielnica administracyjna) of the city of Gdańsk, Poland.

Location 
From the north, the quarter is bordered by the districts of Piecki-Migowo, Siedlce and Wzgórze Mickiewicza, from the east by Chełm and Orunia Górna-Gdańsk Południe, from the south by Orunia Górna-Gdańsk Południe and the rural Gmina Kolbudy and from the west by the district of Jasień.

Quarters of Ujeścisko-Łostowice are:
 Łostowice 
 Ujeścisko
 Zabornia
 Zakoniczyn

History 
In 2010, the fast growing district of Chełm i Gdańsk Południe with a population of about 72,000 has been divided in the districts of (larger) Chełm and Ujeścisko-Łostowice, which got the final shape in 2014. When Chełm reached a population of 51,000, the city council decided on August 30, 2018 for a second division in the smaller district of Chełm and the district Orunia Górna-Gdańsk Południe.

Tourism 
Tourist attractions:
 Dwor Zakoniczyn, 19th century manor house
 Łostowicki cemetery (Cmentarz Łostowice),  the largest cemetery in Gdańsk, founded in 1906
 The modern churches
 sw. Ojca Pio
 sw. Teresy Benedykty od Krzyża
 św. Judy Tadeusza Apostoła.

References

External links 

 Podział administracyjny Gdańska (Polish)
 gedanopedia.pl: Ujeścisko (Polish)
 gedanopedia.pl: Łostowice (Polish)
 gedanopedia.pl: Chełm (Polish)

Districts of Gdańsk